Sipahili (former Babadıl) is a village in Gülnar district of Mersin Province, Turkey. At  it is situated at the east bank of a creek. It is on the state highway . The population of the village was 380 as of 2012.

References

Villages in Gülnar District
Populated coastal places in Turkey